Velilla del Río Carrión is a municipality located in the province of Palencia, Castile and León, Spain. According to the 2004 census (INE), the municipality has a population of 1,632 inhabitants.

Here is the Velilla Power Plant, a coal-fired power station, and the Fuentes Tamáricas, cantabrian intermittent fountains.

Notable people 
Mara Santos, world champion in canoe marathon.

References

External links
Official site.

Municipalities in the Province of Palencia